Dragoevo is a village in the municipality of Štip, North Macedonia.

Demographics
According to the 2002 census, the village had a total of 130 inhabitants. Ethnic groups in the village include:

Macedonians 113
Turks 3
Aromanians 14

References

Villages in Štip Municipality